Ebrahim Hut Bazar (also Romanized as Ebrāhīm Ḩūt Bāzār; also known as Ebrāhīm Bāzār, Hot Qādir Bakhsh, Ḩūt-e Ebrāhīm, and Hūt-e Qadīr Bakhsh) is a village in Polan Rural District, Polan District, Chabahar County, Sistan and Baluchestan Province, Iran. At the 2006 census, its population was 392, in 83 families.

References 

Populated places in Chabahar County